Buts is a surname. Notable people with the name include:

Petro Buts (born 1966), Ukrainian football player and coach
Vitaliy Buts (born 1986), Ukrainian road bicycle racer

See also
Butts (surname)
Butz, surname
But (surname)